Mitchell G. Holthus (born June 28, 1957), is the play-by-play announcer for the Kansas City Chiefs and a college basketball announcer for ESPN. Additionally, he hosts Chiefs Insider, Defending the Kingdom, Chiefs Rewind and Chiefs Field Pass.

Early life
Holthus is a native of Smith Center, Kansas, where he was a multi-sport athlete in high school. During those years he began his first tentative steps toward a radio career by announcing at his school games. After graduation, Holthus graduated with a Bachelors in Journalism from Kansas State University (1979) and a business administration degree (1980).

Broadcast career
In 1983, Mitch Holthus replaced Steve Physioc as the radio voice of the Kansas State Wildcats, broadcasting the schools' football and basketball games until 1996. Holthus was a finalist for broadcasting jobs with several NFL teams in the early 1990s, including the Minnesota Vikings, Chicago Bears, and Atlanta Falcons. Holthus has been with the Chiefs Radio Network since 1994, when he took over for Kevin Harlan, making him the longest-tenured play-by-play announcer in Chiefs history.  He is best known perhaps for his drawn-out, exuberant "Touchdown, KAN-SAS CITY!" whenever the Chiefs reach the end zone, and his call when the Chiefs won Super Bowl LIV: "The game is over, and the Chiefs Kingdom has firmly planted its flag on top of football's highest summit!"  In addition to his radio work, Holthus hosts "Minute With Mitch" and "Chiefs Insider" on select stations in the Chiefs television network.  In addition to his work with the Kansas City Chiefs, Holthus is an announcer for Big 12 Conference and Missouri Valley Conference basketball games on regional television, as well as calling some college basketball games for ESPNU. Holthus is a past President of the National Sportscasters and Sportswriters Association, and serves on its board of directors.

Personal life
He is married to the former Tami Johnson of McPherson, Kansas, a former Kansas State women's basketball player. They have two children. Holthus often sends a radio "shout out" to the Roxbury Fan Club, a greeting to members of his family that live near Roxbury, Kansas. Holthus is a Christian.

Awards

 8-time Kansas Sportscaster of the Year
 9-time winner Kansas Broadcasters Association best play-by-play sportscast.
 1996 "Hod Humiston Award of Excellence" in Kansas Sportscasting.
 2007 awarded the "John Sanders Spirit of the Valley" by the Missouri Valley Conference.

References

External links
The Kansas City Chiefs Radio Network on 101 The FOX KCFX
Mitch Holthus Otellus Profile
Mitch Holthus Bio

Living people
College football announcers
College basketball announcers in the United States
Kansas State University alumni
Kansas City Chiefs announcers
National Football League announcers
People from Smith Center, Kansas
1957 births